Don't Look Back may refer to:

Film and television
 Dont Look Back, a 1967 documentary about Bob Dylan
 Don't Look Back (1996 film), an action/thriller television film
 Don't Look Back (1999 film), a Japanese film
 Don't Look Back (2009 film), a French thriller
 Rest Stop: Don't Look Back, 2008 American film
 "Don't Look Back" (Heroes), a 2006 episode of Heroes
 "Don't Look Back" (In the Heat of the Night), an episode of In the Heat of the Night
 Don't Look Back: The Legend of Orpheus, a 2013 South Korean KBS television series
 Don't Look Back: The Story of Leroy 'Satchel' Paige, a 1981 television film about the baseball player

Music

Albums
 Don't Look Back (Boston album), or the title song (see below), 1978
 Don't Look Back (Celeste Buckingham album), or the title song, 2012
 Don't Look Back (Harold Vick album), 1974
 Don't Look Back (John Lee Hooker album), or the title song (see below), 1997
 Don't Look Back (Nat Adderley album), 1976
 Don't Look Back (Natalie Cole album), 1980
 Don't Look Back – The Very Best of The Korgis, 2003
 Don't Look Back, an album by Al Green, 1993
 Don't Look Back, an album by Anelia, 2004
 Don't Look Back, an album by Lonnie Lee, 1993
 Don't Look Back, a mix album by Timo Maas, 2005

Songs
 "Don't Look Back" (Boston song), 1978
 "Don't Look Back" (Fine Young Cannibals song), 1989
 "Don't Look Back" (Gary Morris song), 1982
 "Don't Look Back" (John Lee Hooker song), 1964
 "Don't Look Back" (Lloyd Cole song), 1990
 "Don't Look Back" (Lucie Silvas song), 2005
 "Don't Look Back" (Matrix & Futruebound song), 2014
 "Don't Look Back!", a 2015 song by NMB48
 "Don't Look Back" (The Remains song), 1966
 "Don't Look Back" (The Temptations song), 1965, notably covered by Peter Tosh and Mick Jagger (1978)
 "Don't Look Back" (Thalía song), 2004
 "Don't Look Back", a song by Ayumi Hamasaki from Rock 'n' Roll Circus
 "Don't Look Back", a song by Bruce Springsteen from Tracks
 "Don't Look Back", a song by Cutting Crew from Broadcast
 "Don't Look Back", a song by Dave Koz and Jeff Koz from Off the Beaten Path
 "Don't Look Back", a song by She and Him from Volume Two
 "Don't Look Back", a song by Telepopmusik from Angel Milk
 "Don't Look Back", a song by Jackson C. Frank from Jackson C. Frank
 "Don't Look Back (movement 9)", a track by Jean Michel Jarre from Equinoxe Infinity

Other uses
 Don't Look Back (concert series), an annual concert series in London
 Don't Look Back (novel), a 1996 novel by Karin Fossum
 Don't Look Back (role-playing game), a 1994 pen-and-paper table-top game
 Don't Look Back (video game), a 2009 platform game
 Don't Look Back, a novel in the Nancy Drew on Campus series